Kipp Emmanuel Vickers (born August 27, 1969) is a former American football offensive guard in the National Football League (NFL) for the Indianapolis Colts, Washington Redskins, and the Baltimore Ravens. He played college football at the University of Miami.  He played high school football at Tarpon Springs High School helping take the Spongers to the 1986 state 4A championship game where they lost to Ft. Lauderdale Dillard. At the University of Miami he won national championships in 1989 and 1991.

External links
 

1969 births
Living people
Players of American football from Miami
American football offensive guards
Miami Hurricanes football players
Frankfurt Galaxy players
Indianapolis Colts players
Washington Redskins players
Baltimore Ravens players
Sportspeople from Pinellas County, Florida